Metriochroa symplocosella is a moth of the family Gracillariidae. It is found in Hunan, China.

The wingspan is 6.2–8 mm. The forewings are white to ochreous white and scattered with brown scales and with dark brown obscure patches. The hindwings are whitish grey or grey.

The larvae feed on Symplocos anomala and Symplocos sumuntia. They mine the leaves of their host plant. They mine the adaxial (toward the center) epidermis of the leaf, forming a narrow, long serpentine mine. Usually, one to two mines are found in a single leaf. The species overwinters as a larva within the mine.

Etymology
The name is derived from Symplocos, the generic name of the host plant.

References

Moths described in 2013
Phyllocnistinae